Ryan Byron McGuire (born November 23, 1971) is an American retired professional baseball player. He played six seasons in Major League Baseball, from 1997–2002, as a first baseman and outfielder. In his MLB career, he played for the Montreal Expos, New York Mets, Florida Marlins, and Baltimore Orioles.

References

External links

1971 births
Living people
All-American college baseball players
American expatriate baseball players in Canada
Baltimore Orioles players
Baseball players from California
Calgary Cannons players
Columbus Clippers players
El Camino Real High School alumni
Florida Marlins players
Fort Lauderdale Red Sox players
Lynchburg Red Sox players
Major League Baseball outfielders
Montreal Expos players
New York Mets players
Norfolk Tides players
Ottawa Lynx players
Rochester Red Wings players
Trenton Thunder players
UCLA Bruins baseball players
Anchorage Glacier Pilots players
Mat-Su Miners players